Piet Chielens (born 1956) a Belgian writer, translator and curator.  He is coordinator of the In Flanders Fields Museum in Ypres (Ieper) in Belgium. He is also artistic director of Vredesconcerten Passendale (Passchendaele Peace Concerts).

Chielens was born in Reningelst.  He is co-author, with Julian Putkowski, of Unquiet Graves / Rusteloze Graven Guide: Execution Sites of the First World War in Flanders.

Bibliography
 Putkowski, Julian & Chielens, Piet; Unquiet Graves / Rusteloze Graven Guide: Execution Sites of the First World War in Flanders, (UK: Francis Boutle Publishers, 2000)

References

1956 births
Living people
People from Poperinge
Historians of World War I
Military discipline and World War I
20th-century Belgian historians